Çalta may refer to either of two different settlements in Turkey:

Çalta, Kazan, in Ankara Province
Çalta, Kızılcahamam, in Ankara Province

See also 
Calta